Okia may refer to:
 Okia (plant), a genus of plants in the family Asteraceae
 Okia, Kenya, settlement in Kenya
 Okia, settlement in Congo Republic
 Okia River, in Nigeria
 Okia, surname
 Richard Okia, Uganda cricketer